Covenant may refer to:

Religion

 Covenant (religion), a formal alliance or agreement made by God with a religious community or with humanity in general
 Covenant (biblical), in the Hebrew Bible
 Covenant in Mormonism, a sacred agreement between God and a person or group of people
 Covenant of allegiance in Ahmadiyya Islam, which requires followers to fulfill the Ten Conditions of Bai'at
 Covenant of Bahá'u'lláh, in the Bahá'í faith, two separate binding agreements between God and man
 Greater Covenant, the covenant made between each Manifestation from God and his followers regarding the coming of the next Manifestation from God
 Lesser Covenant, regarding the successorship of authority within the religion
 Covenant theology, in Christianity interpretations of a covenant surrounding Jesus's death and resurrection
 Mosaic covenant, a biblical covenant between God and the biblical Israelites, including their proselytes.
 New Covenant theology, a Christian theological position teaching that the Old Testament laws have been abrogated or cancelled with Jesus' crucifixion, and replaced with the Law of Christ of the New Covenant
 New Covenant, a biblical interpretation often thought of as an eschatological Messianic Age or world to come and is related to the biblical concept of the Kingdom of God
 Solemn League and Covenant, an agreement between the Scottish Covenanters and the leaders of the English Parliamentarians in 1643 during the First English Civil War
 Church covenant, a promise made by members to each other within a Christian church

Law
 Covenant (law), a promise to engage in or refrain from a specified action (including restrictive covenant, a restriction on the use of property)
 Covenant marriage, a marriage contract that does not allow for no-fault divorce

Film and television

Film
 The Covenant (1985 film), an American television horror film
 The Covenant (2006 film), an American supernatural horror film
 Alien: Covenant, a 2017 film by Ridley Scott; the second prequel in the Alien franchise
 The Covenant (2023 film), an action-thriller film

Television
 The Covenant (Alias), a fictional organization in the series Alias
 "Covenant" (Millennium), a 1997 episode
 "Covenant" (Smallville), a 2004 episode
 "Covenant" (Star Trek: Deep Space Nine), a 1998 episode
 "Covenant" (Stargate SG-1), a 2004 episode
 "The Covenant"  (Homeland), a 2017 episode
 "The Covenant"  (Walker, Texas Ranger), a 1995 episode

Fiction
 Covenant (short story), a short story by Elizabeth Bear
 Covenant (World of Darkness), in the fictional World of Darkness universe
 The Covenant (novel), a novel by James Michener set in South Africa
 Thomas Covenant the Unbeliever, the protagonist and title character of a series of fantasy novels by Stephen R. Donaldson

Music
 Covenant (band), a Swedish band
 Covenant, former name of the Norwegian band The Kovenant
 Covenant (Greg Brown album)
 Covenant (Morbid Angel album), the third album by death metal band Morbid Angel
 Covenant (UFO album), the 16th album by heavy metal band UFO

Video games
 Covenant (Halo), a religious alliance of alien races in the Halo video game series
 Shadow Hearts: Covenant, console role-playing game developed by Nautilus and published by Midway in 2004
 Daggerfall Covenant, a faction in MMORPG The Elder Scrolls Online
 The Covenant, a 1985 video game by PSS software
 Covenant, the name of a Settlement in Fallout 4